Line 2 of the Fuzhou Metro is a subway line in the city of Fuzhou, Fujian Province in China. The construction of this line started on November 28, 2014. The line is 30.629 km long with 22 stations. Line 2's color is  green. Line 2 runs in an east–west direction and cover the primary education zones, industrial zones, big residential areas of Fuzhou. The line opened on 26 April 2019.

Opening timeline

Stations

See also 
 List of metro systems

References

External links 
 Fuzhou CETC Rail Transit Co., Ltd. - official website (Operator of Line 2) 

02
Railway lines opened in 2019
2019 establishments in China